Rolland Dion (5 July 1938 – 4 June 2011) was the mayor of Saint-Raymond, Quebec, which was also his birthplace. He was also a former Liberal party member of the House of Commons of Canada. He was a businessman by career.

He was mayor of Saint-Raymond from 1973 to 1979.  He won the riding of Portneuf in the 1979 federal election and was re-elected there in 1980. Dion was defeated in 1984 by Marc Ferland of the Progressive Conservative party. He served in the 31st and 32nd Canadian Parliaments.  He served again as mayor of Saint-Raymond from 2006 until his death in 2011.

External links
 

1938 births
2011 deaths
Members of the House of Commons of Canada from Quebec
Liberal Party of Canada MPs
Mayors of places in Quebec